Clivia  is a genus of monocot flowering plants native to southern Africa. They are from the family Amaryllidaceae, subfamily Amaryllidoideae. Common names are Natal lily or bush lily.

They are herbaceous or evergreen perennial plants, with green, strap-like leaves. Individual flowers are more or less bell-shaped, occurring in umbels on a stalk above the foliage; colors typically range from yellow through orange to red. Many cultivars exist, some with variegated leaf patterns.

Description
Species of Clivia are found only in South Africa and Eswatini. They are typically forest undergrowth plants, adapted to low light (with the exception of C. mirabilis from the Western Cape).

Clivia shares common features with the other members of the subfamily Amaryllidoideae. Individual flowers have three sepals and three petals, all very similar (although the sepals are typically narrower than the petals) and collectively called tepals. In Clivia the tepals are fused at the base to form a tube, although this may be very short. The flower varies in shape from an open cup to a narrow hanging tube. In the species the flowers are mainly in shades of yellow through orange to red. The flowers are arranged in umbels (i.e. the flower-stalks or pedicels radiate from a single point); each umbel has a long stalk or peduncle. Several bracts subtend the umbels. Each flower has six stamens and an inferior ovary (i.e. one which is below the tepals) made up of three locules. The stamens have long filaments and anthers which are free to move on their filaments. The style is longer than the tepals, ending in a short three-part stigma.

Flowering time varies. Typically C. miniata, C. nobilis and C. caulescens flower in late winter and spring; in cultivation, C. miniata has out of season flowers at almost any time. C. gardenii and C. robusta flower in the autumn. Interspecific hybrids and cultivars can flower at almost any time of the year depending on climate and the flowering pattern of their parent species.

A distinctive feature of Clivia – shared with the closely related genus Cryptostephanus – is that unlike most species in the subfamily, it does not form bulbs. The long strap-shaped leaves are evergreen and spring from thick branching roots or rhizomes. Like other members of the tribe Haemantheae to which it belongs, Clivia fruits are berries. When ripe, they contain large fleshy seeds which are often more than 1 cm in diameter.

Taxonomy

Specimens were collected by the British explorers William Burchell and John Bowie in 1815 and 1820, respectively. Clivia nobilis became the first named species when in 1828 the Kew botanist John Lindley named it in honor of Charlotte Percy (née Clive), Duchess of Northumberland (1787–1866), who was for a time the governess of the future Queen Victoria.

Evolution and phylogeny

Six genera have been placed in the tribe Haemantheae; all are found in Africa. Molecular phylogenetic analysis carried out in 2004 showed that the tribe is monophyletic (i.e. it contains all the descendants of a single common ancestor). Four species of Clivia were included in the analysis:

The bulbless Clivia and Cryptostephanus appear to occupy a basal position within the clade. Meerow and Clayton suggest that a forest understorey habitat, associated with the absence of bulbs and the presence of fruits which are berries, may have been a factor in the evolutionary divergence of the Haemantheae clade from the rest of the subfamily Amaryllidoideae.

Species

, six species are recognized by the World Checklist of Selected Plant Families:
Clivia caulescens R.A.Dyer
Clivia gardenii Hook.
Clivia miniata (Lindl.) Bosse
Clivia mirabilis Rourke
Clivia nobilis Lindl.
Clivia robusta B.G.Murray et al.

C. mirabilis was only named in 2000, and C. robusta even later, in 2004. Thus older sources frequently state that there are only four or five species.

Natural hybrids
Clivia × nimbicola Swanev., Truter & A.E.van Wyk = C. caulescens × C. miniata

Cultivation
Of the species, Clivia miniata is the most widely cultivated; cultivars with flowers ranging from deep red-orange to pale yellow have been bred by growers. Yellow plants can belong to one of two different groups which breed true for colour, producing seedlings with unpigmented stems and all yellow flowers when mature. When yellows from different groups are crossed, seedlings with pigmented stems occur and the resulting flowers are orange.

C. miniata, C. gardenii, C. robusta and C. caulescens seedlings flower after four to five years. C. nobilis will flower after seven or eight years. It is reported that C. mirabilis also takes about 6 years to flower.

Care

In cultivation, it is recommended that plants are watered regularly in summer, although not overwatered, with a resting period from autumn till late winter, when the plants are kept almost dry at 46-50 °F (8-10 °C). Plants can be repotted yearly or every other year in all-purpose potting medium or coconut husks.

Propagation is by seed or by offsets removed when repotting. Seeds are sown on the top of moist material in high humidity.

Pests and diseases include scale insects, mealy bug, and rot.

Clivia Societies
Clivias are popular as garden plants with many public mass plantings of older miniata cultivars and interspecific hybrids. There are also groups of hobbyists growers around the world who meet regularly to learn more and display newer improved specimens. Clubs in Australia include the Melbourne Clivia Group, who meet to share information and promote the culture of Clivias, and the Toowoomba Cliva Society who showcase during the Toowoomba Carnival of Flowers occurring each Spring.   In the United States, The Southern California Clivia Club meets regularly throughout the year and puts on an annual show each March at The Sherman Library and Gardens in Corona del Mar, California.

Notable Breeders
Well known breeders of Clivias in Australia include the late Kevin Walters of Toowoomba, perhaps best known for his cultivar 'Relly Williams'. Harold Koopowitz's book discusses in great detail many notable breeders.

Toxicity
Some species of Clivia, including Clivia miniata, produce small amounts of the alkaloid lycorine. Lycorine is toxic in sufficient quantities, particularly in pets and small children.

See also

 List of plants known as lily

References

Bibliography 

 
 

Amaryllidoideae
Amaryllidaceae genera
Garden plants of Southern Africa
Flora of Southern Africa